This is a sortable table of the approximately 4,556 townlands in County Galway , Ireland.

It does not show townlands in the Civil Parish of Inishbofin that were transferred to Galway from Mayo in 1873 or a few townlands transferred into Galway in 1899 to complete the Ballinsloe Town boundary.

It does show townlands transferred to Roscommon, Mayo and Clare in 1899.

Duplicate names occur where there is more than one townland with the same name in the county. Names marked in bold typeface are Towns (not Townlands) and villages, and the word Town appears for those entries in the Acres column.

Townland list

References

Townlands of County Galway
Galway
Galway
Townlands